Tigramuna is an Australian band active since 1993 that combines Latin-American music with jazz. Their album Jazz Latino-Americano was nominated for ARIA Award for Best World Music Album.

Members
Carlos Villanueva
Wendy Upjohn 
Fernando Arancibia
Craig Driscoll
Richard Ottmar
Phillip South
Andrew Robertson
Mark Taylor
Emile Nelson
Jeff Camilleri
Robbie Siracusa
Willow Neilson
Nick Southcott
Duano Martinez
Evan Mannell
Nicolas Villanueva
Marcelo Villanueva
Ednaldo Ignacio
Claudio Hevia
Marco Cavajal
Hamish Mcleod

Discography

Albums

Awards and nominations

ARIA Music Awards
The ARIA Music Awards is an annual awards ceremony that recognises excellence, innovation, and achievement across all genres of Australian music. They commenced in 1987.

! 
|-
| 1998
| Jazz Latino - Americano
| ARIA Award for Best World Music Album
| 
| 
|-

References

Australian world music groups
Australian jazz ensembles